16S rRNA (adenine1518-N6/adenine1519-N6)-dimethyltransferase (S-adenosylmethionine-6-N',N'-adenosyl (rRNA) dimethyltransferase, KsgA, ksgA methyltransferase) is an enzyme with systematic name S-adenosyl-L-methionine:16S rRNA (adenine1518-N6/adenine1519-N6)-dimethyltransferase. This enzyme catalyses the following chemical reaction

 4 S-adenosyl-L-methionine + adenine1518/adenine1519 in 16S rRNA  4 Ribosomal RNA + N6-dimethyladenine1518/N6-dimethyladenine1519 in 16S rRNA

KsgA introduces the dimethylation of adenine1518 and adenine1519 in 16S rRNA. Strains lacking the methylase are resistant to kasugamycin [1].

References

External links 
 

EC 2.1.1